Submarine is the debut solo EP by English musician and Arctic Monkeys lead vocalist Alex Turner, released on 14 March 2011 by Domino Recording Company. It was written by Turner in 2009, on an acoustic guitar, at his New York City home. It was produced in London by frequent collaborator James Ford, alongside guest musician Bill Ryder-Jones, and string arranger Owen Pallett. The EP consists of six original songs that act as the soundtrack of Richard Ayoade's debut feature film, Submarine (2010), based on the novel by Joe Dunthorne. The artwork is a resized version of the film's poster, which depicts lead actor Craig Roberts.

Submarine is a departure from Turner's previous guitar-heavy work, with the Arctic Monkeys, and more in line with the baroque-oriented sound found in The Age of the Understatement (2008). It features a Indie folk sound, drawing influences from baroque pop and psychedelic pop. Instrumentally, it incorporates acoustic guitar, drums, organ, and piano, featuring strings in one track. Its lyrical content matches the melancholic tone of the film, exploring romance, loneliness, and  depression.

Despite its stylistic deviation from Turner's previous oeuvre, Submarine was released to generally positive reviews. It peaked at 35 in the UK Albums Chart while also charting in France and Ireland. Following its release the record appeared on The Times'''s  2014 list of 100 Soundtracks to Love. Retrospectively, Submarine its considered a stepping stone in Turner's continued musical experimentation, leading to one of its tracks, "Piledriver Waltz", being re-recorded by Turner's band Arctic Monkeys, for their fourth album Suck It and See. The soundtrack has been described as being the most discussed feature of its accompanying film, contributing to its lasting popularity.

Background and recording
Turner's previous record as part of Arctic Monkeys' Humbug was released in August 2009 to positive reviews from critics, that noted the album's tone was darker, compared to the band's previous work. Following the release of Humbug, film director and friend Richard Ayoade  was directing a film adaptation of Joe Dunthorne's  novel, Submarine. Ayoade thought of Turner for the film's soundtrack,  with the only concern of seeming "imposing" by asking him to do "a load of work." Turner said that making music for a film was something he felt was not "qualified to do" but that this was "an exception" due to his friendship with Ayoade. Initially he approached him with the idea of doing cover versions, similarly to how it was done in The Graduate (1967), but ended up using six original songs written by Turner. Some of the versions that were recorded included John Cale's Fear is a Man's Best Friend and Big White Cloud, Nico's I'm Not Sayin', and Irving Berlin's How Deep is the Ocean?After touring Humbug, Turner wrote the songs at his, at the time, home in Brooklyn, New York. He already had some done– including 'It's Hard to Get Around the Wind' and 'Hiding Tonight'– that he felt could not be released with Arctic Monkeys or his side project The Last Shadow Puppets, due to him "picking an acoustic guitar" not fitting the bands' current styles. He found that relaxed type of playing "refreshing." Turner showed those songs to Ayoade and then wrote the rest, although he had read the book at Ayoade's request and watched the dailies from the film set, he said they were not particularly written based on the film scenes.

In April 2010, Turner recorded the EP at One Inch studios in London with frequent collaborator James Ford serving as producer. Him and Ford played most of the instruments while Bill Ryder-Jones played guitar on two tracks. Strings for "Piledriver Waltz" were recorded at Air Studios in London, and arranged by Owen Pallett, who had previously worked with Turner on The Last Shadow Puppets' debut record. At the time, the edit of the film was more advanced, "Richard came down, and we played with some of the structures of the songs to make them fit a bit better, in terms of the length being right" Turner recalled.

Composition
Musical style and influences

In his first effort as a solo artist, Turner changed his habitual rock style for a more simple, acoustic driven sound. It has been characterised as Indie folk. Further incorporating influences from baroque pop and psychedelic pop. Its sound has been described as being "in a stripped down, mainly acoustic vein." Instrumentally, it incorporates acoustic guitar, drums, and piano, featuring strings in one of the tracks. In terms of lyrics, Turner tried to avoid, "making them about the character too much, or [...] being like a narration," and wanted them to complement what was happening on screen, "without it being too direct, that was like the balance we trying to strive for, certainly in the lyrics and the tunes."

The EP has been compared to the works of Richard Hawley, Bob Dylan, Simon and Garfunkel, John Lennon, Roy Orbison, Scott Walker, and Cat Stevens's soundtrack for Harold and Maude.Songs
The EP's opening track, is a snippet of "Stuck in a Puzzle," the fifth track. The intro is followed by "Hiding Tonight," which has a "Richard Hawley-esque tone," with a "totally unobtrusive" instrumentation, featuring a "quiet guitar," and "dry electric notes" that "echo around the periphery upon a invitingly fuzzy organ drone." With a "undramatic and unhurried" melody, and similar vocal delivery, that retains Turner's "characteristically wordy style." The lyrics make a reference to the traditional game coconut shy. Overall, the song has been described as "a gently meandering meditation on unrequited yearning," as well as, "quiet, serene." It was compared to Hawley's Coles Corner.In "Glass in the Park" Drowned In Sound noted the influence of Roy Orbison, Scott Walker, and Hawley. Instrumentally, it has a "swoon-worthy" melody and "seductive fretboard slides," featuring "maybe a harmony or two." Glass in the Park was one of the oldest songs in the EP, alongside "Hiding Tonight." Both were written before Ayoade approached Turner to do the soundtrack, he thought they wouldn't fit as part of his bands' sound, so he played them to Ayoade, who thought they would be a good choice for the film. Lyrically, it recounts "a lazy afternoon between two young lovers, whispering impossibly grand promises to each other."

"It's Hard to Get Around the Wind" is a folk track that has been described as a "Dylanesque puzzler," and compared to Simon and Garfunkel. Turner's voice has a "humble charm," with the lyrics being "reproachful and flinty." Instrumentally it features Turner "finger-picking" on his acoustic guitar. "Stuck in the Puzzle" has "psych-pop flourishes." Described as the "most musically straightforward track, with a fuller sound." Instrumentally, it "broadens the sonic palette with drums, piano and a shimmer of strings." Lyrically it "carries itself like an early Lennon song,"   changing "post-Beatles angst" for "a late-night head-scratch about the state of things."
	
The final track, "Piledriver Waltz", is a baroque pop song featuring an orchestral arrangement by Owen Pallet. The track has been said to be "the most musically complex" of the record, with "two time signatures, no less." Described as "woozily romantic" with "a mundane bent that avoids sentimentality," and the "finest and most direct song," despite, "the oddity of a change in signature for the gorgeous chorus," as well as, "the most reproachful." Like the first two tracks, Piledriver Waltz was not written specifically for the film.

Reception
CriticalSubmarine received generally favourable reviews from critics, and despite it stylistic deviation, was enjoyed by listeners. At Metacritic, which assigns a normalised rating out of 100 to reviews from mainstream publications, the album received a score of 74, based on 9 reviews.

Paul Thompson of Pitchfork felt "Turner's keen wit and eye for detail" had created a "tender portrayal" of adolescent uncertainty.  Ben Walsh of The Independent said the "exquisite" soundtrack was "reminiscent" of Cat Stevens's work on Harold and Maude. For Drowned In Sound, Neil Ashman thought that similarly to his record with The Last Shadow Puppets, the "late Sixties and early Seventies" provided inspiration, nevertheless, "the mood of gentle wistfulness" was very different to the Puppets' "tactical bombast." He praised the songs' quality as being "on an upward trajectory from start to end." Fraser McAlpine of BBC Music described the record as "five swoony songs, sung beautifully, no duffers, and plenty of knotty lyrics to try and unravel," he also praised Turner's voice and lyrics, adding, "anyone who can sell a line like "If you’re gonna try and walk on water make sure you wear your comfortable shoes" is someone who needs no puffing up." When talking abou the difference between this record and Turner's previous work, Alex Young of Consequence of Sound, said  "perhaps surprisingly, his balladry is second to none," and that "it’d be easy to turn your nose at it, but this is as good as any work he’s done, however different it may be."
 
In another  The Independent review, Andy Gill noted the EP found Turner, "in appropriately reflective, wistful mood," but that, "the beguiling mood of abstracted adolescent self-importance" was a constant throughout. Stephen Thomas Erlewine of AllMusic thought Turner was straddling "a fine line of providing hushed mood music for a film, and delving into someplace deeper," and that the casual nature of the songs kept them, "from truly resonating."

Accolades and retrospective commentary
In 2011, Submarine appeared at number 32 on NME 's Best Albums of the Year list, with Piledriver Waltz, being at 33 on the Best Tracks list.  In 2014, it appeared on The Times's list of 100 Soundtracks to Love. Retrospectively, Submarine its considered a stepping stone in Turner's continued musical experimentation, inspiring the general sound of Turner's band Arctic Monkeys', fourth album Suck It and See, leading to the inclusion on the album of a re-recording of "Piledriver Waltz," and paving the way for Tranquility Base Hotel & Casino, (2018) and The Car'' (2022). The soundtrack has been described as "the most discussed" feature of its accompanying film, contributing to its lasting popularity.

Track listing

Charts

Personnel
 Alex Turner – performance
 James Ford – production, mixing
 Bill Ryder-Jones – guitar 
 The Composers Ensemble – strings 
 Owen Pallett – arrangement
 Andrew Hewitt – conducting
 Jake Jackson – recording

Notes

References

2011 debut EPs
2011 soundtrack albums
Alex Turner (musician) albums
Albums produced by James Ford (musician)
Domino Recording Company EPs